María Guadalupe Urzúa Flores (December 12, 1912 – December 7, 2004) was a Mexican politician, activist, and the Municipal President of Jocotepec, from 1983 to 1985, and the Municipal President of San Martín de Hidalgo, from 1997 to 2000.

Early life
Urzúa Flores was born in the town of Jocotepec, Jalisco, to José Urzúa Gutiérrez, a musician, and Rosario Flores Monroy, a schoolteacher from San Martín de Hidalgo. Her maternal grandfather Gerardo Flores was a physician who, at the request of Benito Juárez, settled in San Martín de Hidalgo. Maternally orphaned shortly after birth, Urzúa Flores was raised by her maternal aunts in San Martín de Hidalgo where she attended the Josefa Ortiz de Domínguez Primary School.

Legacy
The localities of San Martín de Hidalgo and El Tepehuaje de Morelos have honored Urzúa Flores' memory by naming a street (G. Urzúa) and a public library (María Guadalupe Urzúa Flores Municipal Public Library) after her, respectively.

See also 
 1970 Mexican general election
 1982, Jalisco state election
 1997, Jalisco state election
 Jocotepec

References

1912 births
2004 deaths
Members of the Chamber of Deputies (Mexico) for Jalisco
Women mayors of places in Mexico
Municipal presidents in Jalisco
Institutional Revolutionary Party politicians
Politicians from Jalisco
20th-century Mexican politicians
20th-century Mexican women politicians
Deputies of the L Legislature of Mexico
Women members of the Chamber of Deputies (Mexico)